Giada (styled GIADA) is an Italian fashion brand. It was founded in 2001 in Milan by Rosanna Daolio and bought by the Chinese company Redstone Haute Couture in 2011.

In 2013 GIADA opened its first store in Via Monte Napoleone in Milan,  the interior designed by Claudio Silvestrin.

In 2015, Gabriele Colangelo became the creative director of the brand.

Giada launched its womenswear collection in 2016 at Pinacoteca di Brera in Milan and continues to show its collections during Milan Fashion Week.

In 2019 it opened its first store in the United States in Boston, Massachusetts, and debuted at Milan Design Week.

References

Clothing brands of Italy
Companies based in Milan
Italian companies established in 2001
Luxury brands
High fashion brands